Yahoo Software was an early developer of computer software.  During the 1980s, Yahoo Software created the games which were bundled with the early line of Kaypro "luggable" computers.  These games include Ladder, CatChum, Aliens and Star Trek.

Their offices were located in Los Angeles, California.

References

Software companies based in California
Technology companies based in Greater Los Angeles
Companies based in Los Angeles
Defunct software companies of the United States